Nigel Kenneth Dunne (born 1966) has been Dean of Cork since 2007.

He was educated at Trinity College, Dublin and ordained in 1991. After curacies in Dublinhe held incumbencies at Blessington and Bandon.

References

1966 births
Living people
Alumni of Trinity College Dublin
Deans of Cork